The 1981–82 OHL season was the second season of the Ontario Hockey League. The league grows by two teams when, the Cornwall Royals are transferred from the Quebec Major Junior Hockey League, and the Belleville Bulls are awarded a franchise. Fourteen teams each played 68 games. The Kitchener Rangers won the J. Ross Robertson Cup, defeating the Ottawa 67's.

Expansion and Realignment
The league expanded by two teams, as the Belleville Bulls and the Cornwall Royals joined the Ontario Hockey League. Both teams joined the Leyden Division, as the Sault Ste. Marie Greyhounds moved to the Emms Division.

Belleville Bulls

On February 2, 1981, the OHL granted a franchise to the city of Belleville and the ownership group of Dr. Robert L. Vaughan and Bob Dolan. The Bulls would play their home games at the Yardmen Arena. The Bulls would join the Leyden Division.

Prior to joining the OHL, the Bulls played in the Ontario Provincial Junior A Hockey League, beginning in the 1979–80 season. In their final season in the league, Belleville defeated the Guelph Platers to win the OPJHL championship. The club would reach the 1981 Centennial Cup finals, where they lost to the Prince Albert Raiders of the Saskatchewan Junior Hockey League 6–2 in the championship game.

Cornwall Royals

The Cornwall Royals were transferred to the Ontario Hockey League from the Quebec Major Junior Hockey League for the 1981–82 season. Originally an expansion team in 1969, the Royals were a very successful club in the QMJHL, winning the Memorial Cup three times, in 1971, 1980, and 1981. Cornwall would play their home games at the Cornwall Civic Complex. The Royals would join the Leyden Division.

The Royals were able to keep their players from the previous season, including players such as Scott Arniel and Doug Gilmour, who helped lead the team to the 1981 Memorial Cup championship.

Regular season

Final standings
Note: GP = Games played; W = Wins; L = Losses; T = Ties; GF = Goals for; GA = Goals against; PTS = Points; x = clinched playoff berth; y = clinched first round bye; z = clinched division title & first round bye

Leyden Division

Emms Division

Scoring leaders

Playoffs

Division quarter-finals

Leyden Division

(3) Peterborough Petes vs. (5) Kingston Canadians

(4) Toronto Marlboros vs. (6) Cornwall Royals

Emms Division

(3) London Knights vs. (5) Brantford Alexanders

(4) Niagara Falls Flyers vs. (6) Windsor Spitfires

Division semi-finals

Leyden Division

(1) Ottawa 67's vs. (4) Toronto Marlboros

(2) Oshawa Generals vs. (3) Peterborough Petes

Emms Division

(1) Kitchener Rangers vs. (6) Windsor Spitfires

(2) Sault Ste. Marie Greyhounds vs. (5) Brantford Alexanders

Division finals

Leyden Division

(1) Ottawa 67's vs. (2) Oshawa Generals

Emms Division

(1) Kitchener Rangers vs. (2) Sault Ste. Marie Greyhounds

J. Ross Robertson Cup

(L1) Ottawa 67's vs. (E1) Kitchener Rangers

Awards

See also
List of OHA Junior A standings
List of OHL seasons
1982 Memorial Cup
1982 NHL Entry Draft
1981 in sports
1982 in sports

References

HockeyDB

Ontario Hockey League seasons
OHL